Friedrich Heinrich Karl Bobzin (born 1826) was a German artisan and revolutionary who became a member of the German Workers' Society in Brussels in 1847.  He participated in the Baden-Palatinate uprising of 1849.  Together with Struve, Bobzin headed the petty bourgeoisie emigrants in London.

References

German socialists
German revolutionaries
1826 births

Year of death missing